1968 in professional wrestling describes the year's events in the world of professional wrestling.

List of notable promotions 
Only one promotion held notable shows in 1968.

Calendar of notable shows

Championship changes

EMLL

NWA

Debuts
Debut date uncertain:
Blackjack Mulligan
Dusty Rhodes
El Halcón
Jimmy Golden
Kung Fu
Lee Marshall
Marty Jones
Michel Martel
Nikolai Volkoff
El Sicodélico
January 1  Ringo Mendoza
February 24  Enrique Vera
August 30  Kim Duk
November 1  Jimmy Garvin
December  Chavo Guerrero Sr.
December 6  J. J. Dillon

Retirements
 Billy Riley (1920s-1968)

Births
January 1  Mike Lozansky (died in 2003) 
January 5  Noboru Asahi
January 8  Bull Nakano
January 9  Silver King(died in 2019)
January 12  Big Dick Dudley(died in 2002)
January 15  Bull Buchanan
January 31  Ray Odyssey
February 13  Daisuke Ikeda
February 19  August Smisl 
March 7  Súper Brazo
April 16  Vickie Guerrero
March 19  Eddie Watts
March 28  Jaime Cardriche (died in 2000) 
March 31  Naoya Ogawa
April 24:
Yuji Nagata
El Espantito(died in 2020)
May 10  William Regal
May 14  Mantaur
May 24  Rayo Tapatío I
May 26  Simon Diamond
June 17  Minoru Suzuki
June 20  Mr. Gannosuke
June 26  Koji Nakagawa
June 30  The Bodyguard
July 3  Sombrita
July 8  Romeo Valentino 
July 17  Doctor X (died in 2011)
July 18  Pequeño Violencia
August 2  Maximum Capacity (died in 2014)
August 5  Kendo Kashin
August 11:
Head Hunter A
Head Hunter B
August 20  Duke Droese 
August 24  Funaki
September 3  Black Peral (wrestler) 
September 24  Eric Sbraccia
September 28:
Jado
Apolo Dantés
October 3  Chi Chi Cruz 
October 28  Mayumi Ozaki 
October 30  Dr. Luther
November 3  Dirty White Girl
November 10  Mitsuya Nagai
November 12:
Disco Inferno
Kazue Nagahori 
November 29  Hayabusa(died in 2016)
December 8  Michael Cole
December 9:
Kurt Angle
Virus
Jack Dupp 
December 10:
Mephisto
December 26  Mideon

Deaths
January 15  Firpo Segura 60
February 19  George Hackenschmidt 89
March 9:
Bert Ruby 57
John Katan 66
May 30  Espanto I 37
June 10  Wladek Zbyszko 76
June 21  Ike Robin, 81
August 11  Oklahoma Kid (Elmer Gerald), 30
December 3  Dick Shikat, 71

References

 
professional wrestling